Jaroslav Kravárik (born 5 December 1941) is a Czech footballer. He played in one match for the Czechoslovakia national football team in 1965.

References

1941 births
Living people
Czechoslovak footballers
Czechoslovakia international footballers
Place of birth missing (living people)
Association footballers not categorized by position